Eric Proctor (born August 6, 1982) is an American politician who served in the Oklahoma House of Representatives from the 77th district from 2006 to 2018. Proctor, at the age of 24 defeated a ten-year Republican incumbent and was re-elected to five additional terms without opposition.

References

1982 births
Living people
Politicians from Tulsa, Oklahoma
Democratic Party members of the Oklahoma House of Representatives
21st-century American politicians